Frank Carl Reisling (July 25, 1874 in Martins Ferry, Ohio – March 4, 1955 in Tulsa, Oklahoma) was a pitcher in Major League Baseball. He pitched from 1904–1910 with the Brooklyn Superbas and Washington Senators.

References

1874 births
1955 deaths
Baseball players from Ohio
Major League Baseball pitchers
Brooklyn Superbas players
Washington Senators (1901–1960) players
People from Martins Ferry, Ohio
Wheeling Nailers (baseball) players
Youngstown Puddlers players
Zanesville (minor league baseball) players
Toronto Canucks players
Bristol Bell Makers players
Hartford Indians players
Bristol Bellmakers players
Hartford Senators players
Toledo Mud Hens managers
Toledo Mud Hens players
New Orleans Pelicans (baseball) players
Altoona Mountaineers players
Lancaster Red Roses players
York White Roses players
London Tecumsehs (baseball) players
Shamokin (minor league baseball) players